Business Daily was a British weekday financial news programme, shown on Channel 4 between 1987 and 1992.

The programme was produced by Business Television Limited. Business Television became majority-owned by Broadcast Communications in 1988. Broadcast Communications then became a subsidiary of the Guardian and Manchester Evening News Group in 1989.

History
The programme launched on 21 September 1987 as part of Channel 4's 1987 expansion of weekday broadcast hours, following the transfer of ITV Schools programmes from ITV.  The 30-minute programme was broadcast on weekday lunchtimes, initially at 12 noon before transferring to 12.30pm in March 1988, where it would remain until the programme ended in June 1992. The programme was also shown by S4C, but with a one-hour time delay.

In April 1989 the programme became part of Channel 4's new breakfast programme The Channel 4 Daily. Four bite-size editions were broadcast, lasting from 6 to 8 minutes.

In 1990, The Channel 4 Daily's broadcast hours were reduced slightly and the first breakfast edition of Business Daily became a programme in its own right, broadcasting for 8 minutes at 6.20am, prior to the start of The Channel 4 Daily.

On 26 June 1992 the final lunchtime programme was broadcast. The breakfast editions continued for another three months with the final edition being broadcast on 25 September 1992, coinciding with the end of The Channel 4 Daily.

Presenters and reporters
The programme had two main presenters during its time on air: Susannah Simons and Damian Green. During their time as the main presenter, they would present on Mondays to Thursdays with one of the programme's reporters hosting the Friday edition. Dermot Murnaghan was the first presenter of the breakfast programmes, prior to him becoming one of the main presenters of The Channel 4 Daily.

The programme had its own team of reporters and contributors, including Mickey Clark, who would join the presenter in the studio to provide viewers with commentary on the day's market action.

The Business Programme
A spin-off Sunday teatime programme was shown during the early days of the programme's time on air. It was a 45-minute programme which aired between 5.15pm and 6pm.

References

1987 British television series debuts
1992 British television series endings
Business-related television series in the United Kingdom
Channel 4 original programming
English-language television shows